Sarah McAuley (born 21 February 1964) is a Northern Irish international lawn bowler.

She was born in Derry and was selected as part of the Northern Ireland team for the 2018 Commonwealth Games on the Gold Coast in Queensland.

References

1964 births
Living people
Bowls players at the 2018 Commonwealth Games
Female lawn bowls players from Northern Ireland
Commonwealth Games competitors for Northern Ireland